Nina Companeez (26 August 1937 – 9 April 2015) was a French screenwriter and film director. Nina Companeez was the younger daughter of Russian Jewish émigré screenwriter Jacques Companéez and younger sister of contralto Irène Companeez. She was the mother of actress Valentine Varela. 

Companeez was a long time collaborator of Michel Deville. She wrote for 29 films and television shows. In April 2015, she died at the age of 77.

Selected filmography

Writer

 Tonight or Never (1961)
 Adorable Liar (1962)
 Because, Because of a Woman (1963)
 Girl's Apartment (1963)
 Lucky Jo (1964)
 Martin Soldat (1966)
 The Mona Lisa Has Been Stolen (1966)
 Zärtliche Haie (1967)
 Benjamin (1968)
 Bye bye, Barbara (1969)
 The Bear and the Doll (1970)
 Raphael, or The Debauched One (1971)
 Faustine et le Bel Été (1972)
 L'histoire très bonne et très joyeuse de Colinot trousse-chemise (1973)
 The Horseman on the Roof (1995)
 À la recherche du temps perdu (2011)

Actor
 Benjamin (1968) - Une invitée (uncredited)
 Bye bye, Barbara (1969) - La directrice de l'agence de call-girls (uncredited)
 The Bear and the Doll (1970) - Dame en blanche (uncredited)

References

External links

1937 births
2015 deaths
Deaths from cancer in France
French people of Russian-Jewish descent
French film directors
French women film directors
French women screenwriters
French screenwriters
People from Boulogne-Billancourt